Semillas que el mar arrastra is a 2008 documentary film.

Synopsis
In Africa there are many children that dream of crossing the sea, leaving their families and homes behind, believing that they'll have a real chance on the other side. Those that manage to make the crossing soon discover that reality is far from what they had imagined when they find themselves in the internment centers. This documentary lends its voice to those under age immigrants that long for a better life.

Awards
 Festival Image & Vie 2007

External links

2008 films
Senegalese documentary films
Spanish documentary films
2008 documentary films
Documentary films about immigration
2000s Spanish films